Union City is a city in the San Francisco Bay Area in Alameda County, California, United States, located approximately  south of Oakland,  from  San Francisco, and  north of San Jose. Incorporated in 1959, combining the communities of Alvarado and Decoto, the city has 70,000 residents and a very diverse population. Alvarado is a California Historical Landmark (#503). The city celebrated its 50th anniversary in 2009. The city, along with the cities of Fremont and Newark, makes up the Tri-City Area to the south. The city of Hayward surrounds the city to the north.

Geography
The Niles Cone aquifer, managed by the Alameda County Water District, supplies much of the water consumed by Union City.

Demographics

2010
The 2010 United States Census reported that Union City had a population of 69,516. The racial makeup of Union City was 16,640 (23.9%) White, 4,402 (6.3%) Black, 329 (0.5%) Native American, 35,363 (50.9%) Asian, (20.0% Filipino, 12% Indian, 12% Chinese, 3.7% Vietnamese, 0.9% Korean, 0.6% Japanese, 0.6% Pakistani, 0.4% Burmese, 0.2% Cambodian), 892 (1.3%) Pacific Islander, 7,253 (10.4%) from other races, and 4,637 (6.7%) from two or more races. Hispanic or Latino of any race were 15,895 persons (22.9%).

The Census reported that 68,998 people (99.3% of the population) lived in households, 422 (0.6%) lived in non-institutionalized group quarters, and 96 (0.1%) were institutionalized.

There were 20,433 households, out of which 9,066 (44.4%) had children under the age of 18 living in them, 12,734 (62.3%) were opposite-sex married couples living together, 2,761 (13.5%) had a female householder with no husband present, 1,182 (5.8%) had a male householder with no wife present. There were 856 (4.2%) unmarried opposite-sex partnerships, and 128 (0.6%) same-sex married couples or partnerships. 2,740 households (13.4%) were made up of individuals, and 1,002 (4.9%) had someone living alone who was 65 years of age or older. The average household size was 3.38. There were 16,677 families (81.6% of all households); the average family size was 3.69.

The population was spread out, with 16,847 people (24.2%) under the age of 18, 6,453 people (9.3%) aged 18 to 24, 20,360 people (29.3%) aged 25 to 44, 18,146 people (26.1%) aged 45 to 64, and 7,710 people (11.1%) who were 65 years of age or older. The median age was 36.2 years. For every 100 females, there were 97.5 males. For every 100 females age 18 and over, there were 93.8 males.

The homeowner vacancy rate was 1.5%; the rental vacancy rate was 5.3%. 46,272 people (66.6% of the population) lived in owner-occupied housing units and 22,726 people (32.7%) lived in rental housing units. As of 2019, the median price of a house in Union City is between $900,000 and $1,000,000.

2000

As of 2000 the population was 66,869 and 15,696 families residing in Union City and a total of 17,130 jobs and 32,700 employed residents in 2000. The population density was 3,473.0 inhabitants per square mile (1,341.2/km2).

There were 18,642 households, out of which 45.3% had children under the age of 18 living with them, 66.6% were married couples living together, 12.2% had a female householder with no husband present, and 15.8% were non-families. 11.3% of all households were made up of individuals, and 3.8% had someone living alone who was 65 years of age or older. The average household size was 3.57 and the average family size was 3.83. 

In the city, the population varied widely in age, with 27.8% under the age of 18, 9.8% from 18 to 24, 32.7% from 25 to 44, 21.6% from 45 to 64, and 8.1% who were 65 years of age or older. The median age was 33 years. For every 100 females, there were 98.9 males. For every 100 females age 18 and over, there were 96.0 males.

According to a 2007 estimate, the median income for a household in the city was $84,384, and the median income for a family was $87,114. Males had a median income of $45,212 versus $35,085 for females. The per capita income for the city was $22,890. About 4.8% of families and 6.5% of the population were below the poverty line, including 7.0% of those under age 18 and 6.5% of those age 65 or over.

History
The first people in the area, living along Alameda Creek and Dry Creek, were called "Costanoans" (literally, "coastal peoples") by early Spanish explorers and missionaries. Shell mounds along the sloughs of Alameda Creek near the Alvarado sugar mill were refuse dumps of the Costanoans and some contained burial sites. 

The first non-native community in what is now Union City was founded in 1850 by John and William Horner, also called "Union City," after their Sacramento River Steamship, "The Union." In 1854, it merged with the nearby community of New Haven (founded 1851) to form the town of Alvarado, named after the former Mexican governor, Juan Bautista Alvarado. Alvarado was the first county seat of Alameda County, a designation it soon lost in 1865 to San Leandro. Further east, the town of Decoto was founded in 1870 as a railroad hub, with the first Transcontinental Railroad running through it. Alvarado-Niles Road, one of the city's largest streets, connects the historical Fremont district of Niles with the historical Union City district of Alvarado.

The California Beet Sugar Company, which was the first successful sugar beet mill in the United States, was located in Alvarado and began operations in 1870.  It changed owners and names over the years, but the plant was eventually demolished in 1977.

Union City is a former railroad and Steel Town with an extensive industrial heritage. The Pacific States Steel Company occupied the land behind Union City Station which is now being redeveloped into the Union City Station District Downtown. Relatives and descendants of former Pacific States steel workers receive compensation and preference when purchasing new Station District housing. The Alvarado and Decoto neighborhoods were both former railroad hubs and both still have very active railroad lines that bisect both East End and the West Side of town. Trains are a way of life in Union City and natives are accustomed to waiting for Amtrak and freight trains to cross while commuting the city thoroughfares.

In the 1950s, Alvarado and Decoto – the latter now making up the eastern side of the town – were annexation targets of the nearby communities of Newark, Hayward, and what would become Fremont. On January 13, 1959, they decided to incorporate themselves into a single city, and named it after the Horners' original settlement, Union City. Tom Kitayama served as the city's first mayor in 1959 and was involved in Union City politics for 32 years until his retirement in 1991. The population of the city grew from 6,000 in 1959 to 70,000 in 2020. In 2016, Union City started to rebrand and got a new city seal. Union City opened a new Teen Center in 2018.

Economy
Union City is the location of the American Licorice Company's West Coast operations, having moved there in 1971 from San Francisco.

Union City is home to three major health care providers: a Kaiser Permanente facility, the Tiburcio Vasquez Health Center, and Washington Hospital's Nakamura Clinic.

Union City also has a large number of industrial and shipping companies, including R&S Manufacturing, RCD Concrete, Jatco, and EntirelyPets.

Local shopping

Union Landing Shopping Center is a  shopping center, adjacent to Interstate 880 in Union City and is one of the largest centers in the city and has about 70 stores. The mall was completed in 1999 after several years of debate on the land. The land was previously a drive-in movie park. One year later, a nearby Target shopping center was built near Hayward/Union City border near Interstate 880 on Whipple Road.

Top employers
According to Union City's June 2019 Comprehensive Annual Financial Report, the top employers in the city are:

Education
New Haven Unified School District serves 11,756 students from the cities of Union City and Hayward (south). The district consists of seven (K-5) elementary schools, two (6-8) middle schools, one comprehensive high school (James Logan High School) with 3,400 students and one adult/K-12 independent study school. In December 2015, The New Haven Unified School District renamed Alvarado Middle School to Itliong-Vera Cruz Middle School in honor of Philip Vera Cruz and Larry Itliong. The school district has also invested in going all solar at school sites to cut energy costs. They also have an arts center and new track and field at James Logan High School.

Cornerstone International College, located at 725 Whipple Rd., is the first post-secondary institution established in Union City.

Purple Lotus Buddhist School was a K-12 school located in Union City until closure in 2016.

Union City lies within the Ohlone Community College District and Chabot-Las Positas Community College District.

The New Haven Unified School District had a strike about the salary of teachers, which lasted about 3 weeks in 2019.  A 6hr negotiation took place between the district and the teachers.  This was the first strike in the district's history, where nearly 600 teachers planned to strike.

Transportation

Several transit systems serve Union City, including AC Transit, the Dumbarton Express, Bay Area Rapid Transit (BART), and the city's own Union City Transit.

Union City Transit started in 1974 and runs nine bus lines throughout Union City and parts of Hayward.

The BART rail system came to Union City when the system opened in 1972. In 2007 the Union City BART station was rebuilt and developed into Union City Intermodal Transit Station. A second entrance is under construction as of 2019 and will be done in 2022 that will provide future connections to Multimodal trains and the 11th street side of Bart Station.

Union City is also served by a network of high-capacity streets, with four exits on Interstate 880 (Nimitz Freeway), express lanes will open on Interstate 880 Freeway by 2020. Highway 238 also serves the city (Mission Boulevard). Quarry Lakes Parkway formerly known as the East-West Connector, 3.0-mile roadway project that will connect Mission Boulevard and Paseo Padre Parkway and was approved by California Transportation Commission. The commission’s board unanimously voted  to transfer 36 acres of Caltrans-owned land to Union City. The project is estimated to cost $288 million. The project is still years away from breaking ground and is the design phase. The road has been meet with a lot of protest and a lot of residents don’t believe it will address the bad traffic in the area.

Station  district

Union City has invested $100 million into an expansion of the downtown district, including development surrounding the existing BART station, which is itself under construction to link BART with passenger rail services: Capitol Corridor, Dumbarton Rail Corridor and Altamont Corridor Express (ACE). The city is planning East of Bart Station on 7th and 11 streets,  of office space and 1,700 units are in the planning stages and the city of Union city hope breaks ground in 2024. The city expects the project will add 5,000 jobs and revenue.

Government

Union City runs a council–manager government. The Mayor and the City Council consists of five representatives on a part time basis .November 3, 2020, the city switched from citywide elections to four  districts with  each member required to live in their own district. The Mayor will still be elected at large  and represent the whole community.As of December 2023 the following people were elected to office .Gary Singh  District One,District Two Jaime Patiño,District Three Jeff Wang and lastly District Four Scott Sakakihara. The mayor and elected council members serve a 4-year term, with a full 3-term limit. Mayor Carol's seat will be up for election in  November 2024 has it her last term as mayor since 2012 she also was first elected woman to hold the position.  The COVID-19 crisis  dealt a devastating blow to Union City's local economy. Union City will be faced with a $10.5 million annual deficit by Fiscal Year 2025/2026, or equivalent to approximately 15% of the city's annual operating budget. A ten-year financial forecast produced by an independent financial expert shows that the city can expect to deplete all of its $17 million general fund reserves by June 30, 2023. A utility users tax measure was passed in  November 2020 .

Union City Police Department
The Police Department  hosted a Justice & Equality Summit in the hopes of encouraging community conversation and with the goal building bridges of understanding, trust, and community. This first-of-its-kind event gave the community an opportunity to have a real talk discussion with Union City Police and the chance to ask key questions. The idea for a Summit first arose in October 2014 as a way to get community members together to talk about policing issues and to get to know each other better. On December 9, 2014, over 300 James Logan High students organized a peaceful Die In demonstration in front of the police department, a phenomenon that had been occurring in front of police departments around the United States, symbolizing the police community strain that was happening in Ferguson, Missouri. UCPD response was quite effective in making sure it was handled well, and they received considerable praise from the community. This summit was hosted by the New Haven Unified School District's superintendent, the city manager, Vice Mayor, a faith leader, youth leader, and Chief McAllister, the first Black Chief of the Union City Police Department.

Politics
In 2017, Union City had 35,857 registered voters with 19,644 (54.8%) registered as Democrats, 4,200 (11.7%) registered as Republicans, and 10,693 (29.8%) registered as decline to state voters.

Media
Union City, Fremont, and Newark (collectively known as the Tri-Cities) had a daily newspaper called The Argus, which has ceased publication. Union City Patch also serves the community and is part of the Patch.com - a network community news websites that provide residents and visitors city news. The bi-weekly Tri-City Voice newspaper is the remaining print media in Union City.

Cultural landmarks

The first sugar beet factory in the United States was located in Union City, called the California Beet Sugar Company. It is noted by a California Historical Lardmark #768, now found at Dyer and Ratekin.

The Bay Area Flight 93 Memorial is in Sugar Mill Landing Park. It was the first monument completed in the United States designed to honor the passengers and crew of United Airlines Flight 93, which was homeward bound for San Francisco, but was hijacked and crashed in rural Pennsylvania on September 11, 2001.

Site of the first county courthouse

Alameda County's first courthouse was located in the county seat Alvarado, starting on June 6, 1853.  The original courthouse was a two-story wooden building that was originally a mercantile that included a post office. It was built by A.M. Church and Henry C. Smith. In 1865 the county seat was moved to San Leandro. With the widening of Union City Blvd., the original site has since been paved over. The site is listed on the California Historical Landmarks list.

Masonic Home at Union City

Masonic Home at Union City, a senior living community for Masons and their wives or widows, has as its centerpiece a large brick administration building five stories high, visible from Mission Boulevard. The administration building was identified as a significant historic property in the 1974 Historic Resource Inventory of Washington Township. Interior features include a main staircase with stained glass windows, a parlor filled with antiques, and paintings of 14 U.S. presidents who were Masons. The original five-story brick building forming the center or head of the current Administration Building was constructed in 1898 and was the Masonic Widows and Orphans Home overlooking the old town of Decoto. The north and south wings of the current Administration Building were added in 1914 and 1928, respectively. Ten more buildings have been built on this  campus, including Acacia Creek, a continuing care retirement community for all seniors, both Masons and non-Masons, completed in 2010. But all these buildings are hidden from the view from Mission Boulevard by this historic significant administration building.

Climate

Sister cities
Union City's sister cities are:

 Asadabad, Afghanistan
 Baybay, Philippines
 Chiang Rai, Thailand
 Jalandhar, India
 Liyang, China
 Mulegé, Mexico
 Pasay, Philippines

Notable people
Stephen Abas - Olympic silver medalist in freestyle wrestling
Otis Amey - professional football player
Joey Bragg - actor on Disney Channel television series Liv and Maddie
Angelina Camarillo - Former Pop singer, Also associated with NB Ridaz
Vicky Galindo - USA Softball player
Eddie House - professional basketball player
Aaron Ledesma - former Major League Baseball player
Darren Lewis - former Major League Baseball player
Raaginder - Musician and violinist
SuChin Pak - MTV VJ
Kelli White - sprinter
Roy Williams - professional football player

References

External links

 
 Union City Chamber of Commerce
 Union City Library
 Union City's 50th Anniversary Celebration

 
Incorporated cities and towns in California
Cities in Alameda County, California
Cities in the San Francisco Bay Area
1959 establishments in California
Populated coastal places in California